Henry Chew Gaither, born January 25, 1778, to William Gaither I and Elizabeth Howard Davis  served in Maryland House of Delegates  from 1808 to 1810.  He married  Eliza Worthington and had only one child,  William Lingan Gaither who served as Montgomery County's representative in the Maryland House of Delegates from 1839 to 1841.

He died February 12, 1845, and is buried with his wife at Pleasant Fields, his ancestral home.

References

Members of the Maryland House of Delegates
1778 births
1845 deaths